Parornix maliphaga is a moth of the family Gracillariidae. It is known from the central Asian part of Russia and the Russian Far East.

The larvae feed on Malus species. They probably mine the leaves of their host plant.

References

Parornix
Moths of Asia
Moths described in 1979